Ian Johnston (18 June 1947 – 4 September 2018) was an Australian rowing coxswain. He competed in the men's coxed pair event at the 1960 Summer Olympics.

References

1947 births
2018 deaths
Australian male rowers
Olympic rowers of Australia
Rowers at the 1960 Summer Olympics
Coxswains (rowing)
Sportsmen from Victoria (Australia)
20th-century Australian people